Shettleston (Ward 19) is one of the 23 wards of Glasgow City Council. Since its creation in 2007 it has returned four council members, using the single transferable vote system; the boundaries have not changed since it was formed.

Boundaries
Located in the east of Glasgow and immediately north of the River Clyde which forms its southern boundary, the ward is centred around the long-established settlement of Shettleston, and additionally includes the neighbourhoods of Braidfauld (east of Maukinfauld Road), Tollcross, Fullarton/Auchenshuggle, Sandyhills, Mount Vernon, Carmyle and part of Parkhead (north of Tollcross Road). The northern boundary is the North Clyde Line railway.

The ethnic makeup of the Calton ward using the 2011 census population statistics was:

96.7% White Scottish / British / Irish / Other
1.9% Asian (mainly Pakistani)
1% Black (mainly African)
0.4% Mixed / Other Ethnic Group

Councillors

Election results

2022 election

2017 election

2013 by-election
On 7 October 2013, Labour councillor George Ryan died suddenly. A by-election was held on 5 December 2013 and the seat was retained by Labour's Martin Neill.

2012 election

2007 election

See also
Wards of Glasgow

References

External links
Listed Buildings in Shettleston Ward, Glasgow City at British Listed Buildings

Wards of Glasgow